Valiente (International title: Brave) is a Philippine drama television series, broadcast on TV5. It is the reboot of the original drama series of the same name that tells the story of love, hatred, vengeance and friendship.

It returns with a cast led by JC de Vera, Oyo Boy Sotto, Niña Jose, Nadine Samonte, Jaclyn Jose and Michael de Mesa, written by Phil M. Noble from the original story of Gina Marissa Tagasa and directed by Joel Lamangan. Produced by Archangel Productions and TAPE Inc., the show ran from February 13 to June 29, 2012.

Valiente recounts the epic tale of two families whose lives are intertwined by their desire to claim what they believe is rightfully theirs. Gardo and Theo from the two conflicting families of Valiente and Braganza; are two men who used to be best of friends but came to be mortal enemies brought by the ambitious Donya Trining and how will she use her wealth and power in manipulating the life of Gardo Valiente, the real Braganza.

Overview

Adaptation

Valiente is the original 5-year classic and epic drama written by Gina Marissa Tagasa. From the original concept of Antonio Tuviera, the series were top-billed by Tirso Cruz III, Michael de Mesa, Glenda Garcia and Mariz Ricketts. It was originally produced by TAPE Inc. and aired on two stations: ABS-CBN (1992 - 1995) and GMA Network (1995 - 1997).

Plot
The soap's story centered on best friends: Don Armando Braganza and Damian Valiente, most especially their sons, Theo Braganza and Gardo Valiente, whose lives are opposite from each other. Theo was born rich, a playboy and was groomed as heir to Hacienda Braganza. Gardo on the other hand, was born poor, God-fearing and was poised to take over his father Damian as one of Hacienda Braganza's workers. Despite their differences, Gardo and Theo treated each other like brothers until the death of Don Armando which caused conflict in the hacienda when Donya Trinidad took over the ownership, as well as the accidental killing of Theo to Luming Valiente. The conflict worse as an uprising occurred in the hacienda which caused the imprisonment of Damian. After which, Gardo falls for Theo's youngest sister, Maila.  Their relationship was doomed from the start as Theo never liked Maila for Gardo as he preferred her other sister Leona to fall for his friend.

Leona confessed to Gardo the crime her brother made. Theo had accidentally shot Luming Valiente while playing his father's gun a long time ago. Donya Trining concealed this incident by blaming it on rebels. Gardo after finding out of this incident later on planned to retaliate to Theo. He used the rebel's power to threaten the Braganzas. To fix this problem, Donya Trining agreed to imprison Theo but in exchange Gardo will marry Leona. On the day of their marriage, Gardo took his place to reveal Theo's crime in front of prominent persons and mediamen. Because of this incident, Leona lose her consciousness that made her to be placed in a mental hospital, where they discovered that Leona's pregnancy was brought by an anonymous man who raped her.

Theo became very sad on what happened to his family. His sadness let him to comfort his self on a bar where he met Vivian. Vivian knowing on newspaper that her customer is a prominent person placed herself off from Theo even though it did gives love to her. She also advised Theo to come home and face his problems. Theo, knowing Leona's situation, became very mad to Gardo. This let him attempt to kill Gardo one night after burning its face on a fire. Don Luis saw Gardo left bloodied on his way to Rancho Regalado. On the other hand, The Braganzas are in need to supplement their company's near bankruptcy. Donya Trining seeing Vincent Lee, a Chinese businessman that invests a lot in Bahay Pangarap look for him and asked for help. She let her son Theo to be married to Vincent Lee's daughter Elaine to support their company's financial problem. Maila left sorrowful on Gardo's false death. Joel Gatchalian, Theo's friend took this incident to have Maila's love. The situation made Maila to answer yes to Joel's marriage proposal.

Gardo, was left scarred by the tragedy and the betrayal his best friend done to him. Don Luis, pursued him to take his revenge to the Braganzas. Gardo changed his name as Nicolas Vallejo and studied a lot all about business. He even became one of the top amateurs in the corporate world. On the other hand, the ambitious Donya Trining decided to run for mayor of San Rafael. Vincent hearing this supported Donya Trining for him to have the political power on his side for his businesses. He gave up a lot of money for Donya Trining's election campaign. Miguel Magno, Donya Trining's opponent for being mayor took Damian as his adviser and his campaign manager. As his financial support, Miguel took Don Luis. At the end, Donya Trining became the new elected Mayor of San Rafael replacing Mayor Manding. Donya Trining commanded Peping to kill Damian but accidentally the gunshot went to Don Luis. Later they accused Damian for doing this. Damian went to his niece, Vivian to hide from Trining's power. Vincent on the other hand, requests Mayor Trining for her debts to pay it to him immediately. The greedy Mayor Trining in exchange gave him his death. She commanded Peping to kill Vincent. Mayor Trining commanded the whole San Rafael to find Damian with a 2 million pesos in exchange. However, the evidences points Mayor Trining as the primary suspect and this turned out as Nicolas good luck. Mayor Trining asked for Nicolas help to hide her from her crimes. Nicolas helped her with one condition, that is to give him the Villa Braganza's lot title. Mayor Trining with no doubt did what Nicolas said.

Cast and Characters

Main Cast
JC de Vera as Gardo Soledad Valiente / Nicolas Vallejo / Gardo Soledad Braganza
Oyo Boy Sotto as Theo Braganza / Theo Ramirez 
Niña Jose as Leona Braganza
Nadine Samonte as Maila Braganza / Maila Regalado Ilagan-Valiente
Jaclyn Jose as Doña " Trining" Trinidad De los Reyes-Braganza
Michael de Mesa as Damian Valiente 
John Regala as Peping Ramirez

Supporting Cast

Mark Gil as Don Armando Braganza
Gina Alajar as Iluminada "Luming" Soledad-Valiente
Tony Mabesa as Victorino Penitente
Jaime Pebanco as Ariston Bugayon
Racquel Villavicencio as Doña Corazon Braganza
Meg Imperial as Jody
Sunshine Garcia as Vivian
Joel Saracho as Attorney Manalad
Nicco Manalo as Ricky
Erika Padilla as Tess
Andrew Schimmer as Dexter
Jhiz Deocareza as Jaden
Maria Cristina "Kite" Lopez as Pinang

Extended cast

Lorna Tolentino as Mila Regalado-Arden
Roxanne Guinoo as Elaine Lee-Braganza
Odette Khan as Minerva Magbanua
James Blanco as Joel Gatchalian 
Allan Paule as Simon
Crispin Pineda as Javier
Frances Makil-Ignacio as Martha
Toby Alejar as Vincent
Ramon Gutierrez as Miguel

Special Guest
Tirso Cruz III as Don Luis Regalado
Mariz Ricketts as Dr. Lourdes  Asuncion

Cameo Appearance

  Czarina Suzara as young Leona
  Lianne Valentine as young Maila
  Ross Fernando as young Gardo
  Arvic Rivero as young Theo
 Cogie Domingo as young Armando
  Biboy Ramirez as young Damian
 Ciara Sotto as young Luming
  Kathleen Hermosa as young Trining
  Jay Aquitania as young Ariston
  Mico Aytona as young Simon
  Alwyn Uytingco as young Javier
  Joross Gamboa as young Don Luis

Other Cast

  Joe Gruta as Ka Narding
  Mike Magat 
  Dinkydoo Clarion 
  Kimo Paez 
  
  Arjon Lozada 
  Jose Mari Ora 
  Jobert Luzares
  Edwin Reyes as Police Chief
  Miguel Moreno as Doc Jake
  Dang Cruz as Ilyang
  Jessa Mae Bonguyan as Reine
  Menggie Cobarrubias as Mayor Manding
  James David Forda as Kent
  Lui Manansala as Atty. Dela Rosa
  Cara Michel Briquel as Marga
  Erwin Tulfo as Reporter
  Kerbie Zamora as Matthew
  Jett Alcantara as Ka Solomon
  Jerald Napoles as Domeng
  Robert Correa as a Bodyguard
  Kirby Cristobal as a Policemen
  Marc Vito as a Marky

Production

For a span of more than 3 years, TV5 continues in providing viewers quality dramas with highly acclaimed writers and directors, and foremost actors of the Philippine Show business / Cinema that booms the Philippine television. TV5 presents its new and the year's most anticipated TV series, Valiente the remake of the classic teledrama of the 90's with a powerhouse cast of exceptional actors and actresses of 3 generations. The main cast of the series was revealed in its story conference held last November 7, 2011. The series is directed by the multi-awarded and highly acclaimed director, Joel Lamangan fresh from GMA Network's Pahiram ng Isang Ina. The show was written by Phil M. Noble the one who write TV5 Drama's Nandito Ako and Isang Dakot Na Luha. The show was developed by the highly acclaimed writer, Gina Marissa Tagasa way back 1992 from its original telecast. The series brings back its original protagonist, Michael de Mesa to play Damian Valiente, exactly two decades from the date it originally aired on ABS-CBN. This was the third TV project for a TV5 Drama by: JC De Vera after My Driver Sweet Lover and Ang Utol Kong Hoodlum, Nadine Samonte after Rod Santiago's The Sisters and Sa Ngalan ng Ina, and Oyo Boy's Midnight DJ and Carlo J. Caparas' Bangis. Together they form the 4 main young cast with Niña Jose. Oyo Sotto and Nadine Samonte once worked as love team on GMA Network's telefantasya, Leya, Ang Pinakamagandang Babae Sa Ilalim Ng Lupa and now working as siblings in the series. This was the first major project for Niña Jose on TV5 after transferring from ABS-CBN.

Veteran actor's and actresses also form the powerhouse cast of the series. Jaclyn Jose was added to the cast after the unfortunate rejection of Ms. Amalia Fuentes to the role, Donya Trining Braganza. Jaclyn's ex-partner Mark Gil and its brother's ex-wife Gina Alajar was also added to portray the roles Don Armando Braganza and Luming Valiente. The role Luming Valiente was supposedly given to Cherry Pie Picache but it did reject. Another veteran actor, John Regala was also added. This was the first appearance of the said veteran actors together with Michael de Mesa on a major TV5 Drama. Jaclyn Jose also worked on Star Confessions' pilot episode as mother of April Gustillo. Gina Alajar also worked on Untold Stories Mula sa Face to Face in one of its weekly episodes presenting real and untold lives of Face to Face guests. Before this series, Regala also had a special participation on Glamorosa, played as a Gang leader.

Roxanne Guinoo, Toby Alejar, Ramon Christopher Gutierrez and James Blanco were also added in extension of the series. Roxanne portrays the role Elaine Lee, originally played by Jean Garcia. Toby Alejar played as Roxanne's father, Gutierrez played as Trining's political opponent and James Blanco played as Maila's boyfriend. This was the third TV5 Drama project for James Blanco after Mga Nagbabagang Bulaklak and with Nadine Samonte in Rod Santiago's The Sisters. Another set of veteran actor and actresses were added to the series. Tirso Cruz III who played the original Theo Braganza now portrays the helping hand of Gardo Valiente, Don Luis Regalado. The original villainess Donya Trining Braganza, Odette Khan now returns as Minerva Magbanua, the mother of Jaclyn Jose being the new Donya Trining. Lorna Tolentino was added to portray the revenging former rebel Mila Regalado-Arden, Don Luis' sister and Maila's biological mother.

Location
The production is shot in Leviste Mansion, Hacienda Leviste and other town in Lipa City, Batangas.

Critical reception
Critics praised Jaclyn Jose's performance as the main antagonist, Doña Trining Braganza which was originally played by Odette Khan in the original version because of her colorful outfits and impressive handling of lines. Memorable performances included the comeback of original characters Theo, Tirso Cruz III  and Gardo, Michael de Mesa now played different roles. Tirso stars in a short appearance as Don Luis Regalado, a businessman and opponent of the late Armando Braganza while De Mesa's performance as Damian Valiente,  main rival of Trining whose late wife Luming had a son out of wedlock named Gardo played by De Vera, the real Braganza. The TV series also tackled political views in modern society such as corruption, violence, and power.

Theme Song
The official theme song of Valiente is an exceptional rendition of its original theme song as performed by its original singer and music composer, Vic Sotto. Lyrics were made by Gina Marissa Tagasa and rearranged by Marvin Querido.

Production Staff

Director: Joel Lamangan
2nd Unit Director: Rommel Penesa
TV5 Head of Creatives and Entertainment: Perci M. Intalan
Producer: Jojo Oconer
Incharge of Production: Ramel David
Production Unit Manager: Jeann Cabalda Bañaga
Supervising Producer: Bhelle F. Francisco
Original Story: Gina Marissa Tagasa
Creative Manager: Elmer Gatchalian
Head Writer: Danny Shelton
Executive Producer: John Bradshaw
Associate Producers: Vangie F. Castillo, Adrian V. Santos
Writers: Ma. Zita S. Garganera, Liza Magtoto, Abner Tulagan, Joel Saracho
Brainstormers: Emerson Jake Somera, Elle Ortiz Luis, Don Santella, Michelle Ngu
Lighting Director: Monino Duque
Production Designer: Edgar Martin Littaua
Sound Supervision: Alberto Langitan
Master Editor: Roy Diomampo
Musical Scorer: Joubert Tan

Other Staff
Technical Director: Renato Ching
Assistant Director: Allan Noble, Paulo Molina
Art Director: Renato Sanga, Diorgie Tubino
Location Manager: Raul Caro
Fight Instructor: John Lapid
Supervising Editor: Don Santella
Archangel Associate Editor: Mary Angeli Garcia
Archangel Post Production Coordinator: Mario Rapinan
Archangel Marketing and Promotions: Hanzel Vie Calma, Hazel Anne Liban
Archangel Project Accountant: Mariz Lunaria
Archangel Project Bookkeeper: Mavie Pamittan
Cameramen: Jomar Uligan, Madison Fernandez, Jerry Burns, Rey
Talent Coordinator: Virginia Genido
Production Assistant: Edison Suarez, Mary Rose Manansala, Zayra Carreon
Post Production Assistant: Reggie Panaguiton
Recording Mixers of WildSound Studios: Addiss Tabono, Bebet Casas, Alex Tamboo, Roy Santos
Stylist: Shahani Andel Gania
Head Wardrobe: Simeon Guanizo
Wardrobe: Ian Christopher Pangilinan, Jerry Nelson Dumayag, Jomar Pascua, Michael Aguyong
Hair and Make-up Artists: Jessica Atendido, Ronel Buenavente, Christine Bunti, Eileen Ramos
Gaffers: Wilson Rondina, Ramoncito Mariano, Sylvestre Bongay
Assistant Location Manager: Virgilio Martinada
Art Department: Ramil Pineda Robbie Vicente, McRichard Motel, Ferdinand Felicidario, Ezekiel Racho
Art Department: Francisco Deogracia Jr., Mark Joseph Madriaga, John Martin De Guzman, Angel Benipayo
Radio Caretaker: Elmo Gordas
Utility: Romy Bello, Salve Defeo, Mark Joseph Caro
Tent Caretakers: Junjun Rivera, Joey Dordas
Crowd Control: Art Sajar, JR Decano
Field Cashier: Ginger Laguata
Legman: John Phillip Llamosa

See also
List of programs broadcast by TV5
List of shows previously aired by TV5
Valiente (1992 TV series)

International broadcast

References

External links
 
 

TV5 (Philippine TV network) drama series
Mystery television series
2012 Philippine television series debuts
2012 Philippine television series endings
Philippine drama television series
Television series reboots
Television series by TAPE Inc.
Filipino-language television shows